The 1943–44 Iowa State Cyclones men's basketball team represented Iowa State University during the 1943–44 NCAA men's basketball season. The Cyclones were coached by Louis Menze, who was in his sixteenth season with the Cyclones. They played their home games at the State Gymnasium in Ames, Iowa. The Cyclones qualified for the Final Four for the first time in school history, defeating Pepperdine in the NCAA Western Regional, before falling to Utah, 40-31. Initially, it was not even known if Iowa State would be able to fulfill its role in the postseason tournament, but they were ultimately able to do so. Star player Price Brookfield joined the Cyclones mid-season through the naval training program at Iowa State.

Roster

Schedule

|-
!colspan=6 style=""|Regular Season

|-
!colspan=6 style=""|Postseason

|-

References

Iowa State Cyclones men's basketball seasons
Iowa State
NCAA Division I men's basketball tournament Final Four seasons
Iowa State